The Furen Temple is a Chinese temple dedicated to Kai Zhang Sheng Wang, and is located along Daxi Old Street in Daxi District, Taoyuan City, Taiwan. It is the largest temple in Daxi.

History
The temple was established in 1813 by Lee Bing-sheng, Lu Fan-tiao and Lin Ben-yuan. During the Japanese rule of Taiwan, a civilian protection bureau was established at the temple and later on it became a military hospital. It has undergone reconstruction twice.

Architecture
Consisting of three palaces, the temple covers a total area of 990 m2, which makes it the largest temple in Daxi District. Each of the central hall or wing is supported by two dragon pillars. The courtyard is divided into two sections.

See also
 Chin Shan Yen Hui Chi Temple, Taipei
 Shengwang Temple, Changhua County
 Taoyuan Confucian Temple, Taoyuan District
 Xinwu Tianhou Temple, Xinwu District
 List of temples in Taiwan
 List of tourist attractions in Taiwan

References

1813 establishments in Taiwan
Religious buildings and structures completed in 1813
Temples in Taoyuan City
Taoist temples in Taiwan